Legnica Voivodeship was a unit of administrative division and local government in Poland in the years 1975–1998, superseded by Lower Silesian Voivodeship. Its capital city was Legnica.

Major cities and towns (population in 1995)
 Legnica (108,000)
 Lubin (83,500)
 Głogów (74,200)
 Jawor (25,600)
 Polkowice (21,600)

See also
 Voivodeships of Poland

Former voivodeships of Poland (1975–1998)